John W. Inglis (September 4, 1887 – October 6, 1918) was the head football coach for the Rensselaer Polytechnic Institute Engineers football team from 1911 to 1913. He compiled a record of 15–9–4.

Head coaching record

References

1887 births
1918 deaths
RPI Engineers football coaches
Sportspeople from Troy, New York